Kelly Barnhill is an American author of children's literature, fantasy, and science fiction. Her novel The Girl Who Drank the Moon was awarded the 2017 Newbery Medal. Kirkus Reviews named When Women Were Dragons one of the best science fiction and fantasy books of 2022.

Writing career 
Barnhill has received writing fellowships from the Jerome Foundation and the Minnesota State Arts Board and was a 2015 McKnight Writing Fellow in Children’s Literature. She is the winner of the Parents Choice Gold Award, the Texas Library Association Bluebonnet award, and a Charlotte Huck Honor. She also was a finalist for the Minnesota Book Award, the Andre Norton Award, and the PEN/USA literary prize. In 2016, her novella The Unlicensed Magician received the World Fantasy Award for Long Fiction.

In 2017, her novel The Girl Who Drank the Moon was awarded the John Newbery Medal by the American Library Association.

Barnhill's books include The Unlicensed Magician, The Witch's Boy, Iron-Hearted Violet, The Mostly True Story of Jack, as well as several non-fiction titles for children.

In February 2019 Kelly was the Literary Guest of Honor and Keynote Speaker at the 37th annual Life, the Universe, & Everything professional science fiction and fantasy arts symposium.

Personal life 
Barnhill is a graduate of Minneapolis South High School in Minneapolis and St. Catherine University in St. Paul. Her husband, Ted Barnhill, is an architect. They have three children.

Before finding success as an author, Barnhill studied creative writing as an undergraduate, worked for the National Park Service, and was trained as a volunteer firefighter. She began writing short stories after the birth of her second child, and these stories were eventually expanded into full-length novels.

She lives in Minneapolis, Minnesota.

Awards and honors
Kirkus Reviews named When Women Were Dragons one of the best science fiction and fantasy books of 2022.

Publications

 The Mostly True Story of Jack (2011)
 Iron Hearted Violet, illustrated by Iacopo Bruno (2012)
 Mrs. Sorensen and the Sasquatch (2014)
 The Witch's Boy (2014)
 The Unlicensed Magician (2015)
 The Girl Who Drank the Moon (2016)
 Dreadful Young Ladies and Other Stories (2018)
 The Ogress and the Orphans (2022)
 When Women Were Dragons (2022)
 The Crane Husband (expected 2023)

References

External links 

 
 

1973 births
Writers from Minneapolis
Living people
Newbery Medal winners
World Fantasy Award-winning writers
21st-century American novelists
American young adult novelists
American fantasy writers
American science fiction writers
American children's writers
American women novelists
South High School (Minnesota) alumni
21st-century American women writers
Novelists from Minnesota
American women children's writers
Women writers of young adult literature
Women science fiction and fantasy writers
St. Catherine University alumni